Epoch was a Russian literary magazine published in 1864-65 by Fyodor Dostoyevsky and his brother Mikhail.

Publication history
The first two combined numbers of Epoch, for January and February, 1864, were published in March, 1864, containing the opening chapters of Notes from Underground by Fyodor Dostoyevsky. Notes from Underground took up the first four issues of the magazine. His story The Crocodile was published in the last issue. The Crocodile, taken as an attack on Nikolay Chernyshevsky, and his article Mr -bov and the Question of Art, criticising the views of Nikolay Dobrolyubov, created considerable controversy between Dostoyevsky and Russian liberals.

After Mikhail Dostoyevsky's death in 1864, Fyodor became chief editor. He was forced to discontinue publication of the magazine in February 1865 due to financial problems.

Along with Dostoyevsky's works, Epoch published articles by Apollon Grigoryev and Nikolay Strakhov, stories by major writers such as Ivan Turgenev and Nikolai Leskov, and the popular fiction of Vsevolod Krestovsky and others.

References

1864 establishments in the Russian Empire
1865 disestablishments in the Russian Empire
Defunct literary magazines published in Europe
Defunct magazines published in Russia
Defunct political magazines
Fyodor Dostoyevsky
Magazines established in 1864
Magazines disestablished in 1865
Magazines published in Saint Petersburg
Russian-language magazines
Literary magazines published in Russia
Monthly magazines published in Russia
Political magazines published in Russia